Pseudurgis is a genus of moths in the family Tineidae.

Species
 Pseudurgis acosmetos Mey, 2011
 Pseudurgis karoo Mey, 2011
 Pseudurgis leucosema Meyrick, 1908
 Pseudurgis maacki Mey, 2007
 Pseudurgis karoo Mey, 2011
 Pseudurgis mollis Mey, 2011
 Pseudurgis nephelicta Meyrick, 1913
 Pseudurgis ochrolychna Meyrick, 1914
 Pseudurgis poliastis Meyrick, 1937
 Pseudurgis polychorda Meyrick, 1913
 Pseudurgis protracta Meyrick, 1924
 Pseudurgis sceliphrota Meyrick, 1923
 Pseudurgis sciocolona Meyrick, 1914
 Pseudurgis scutifera Meyrick, 1912
 Pseudurgis tectonica Meyrick, 1908
 Pseudurgis tineiformis Mey, 2011
 Pseudurgis undulata Meyrick, 1911
 Pseudurgis vernalis Mey, 2011

References

 , 2011: New and little known species of Lepidoptera of southwestern Africa. Esperiana Buchreihe zur Entomologie Memoir 6: 146-261.

External links
Natural History Museum Lepidoptera generic names catalog

Tineidae
Tineidae genera
Taxa named by Edward Meyrick